Edward Hays is the name of:
Edward D. Hays (1872–1941), U.S. Representative from Missouri
Edward R. Hays (1847–1896), U.S. Representative from Iowa

See also

Edward Hayes (disambiguation)
Edward Hay (disambiguation)